17th Brigade may refer to:

Australia
 17th Brigade (Australia)
 17th Sustainment Brigade (Australia)

India
 17th Indian Infantry Brigade

Iran
 17th Ali ibn Abi Taleb Division

Nigeria
17 Brigade (Nigeria)

Spain
 17th Mixed Brigade

Ukraine
 17th Armored Brigade (Ukraine)

United Kingdom
 17th Infantry Brigade (United Kingdom)
 17th Mounted Brigade (United Kingdom)
 Artillery Brigades
 17th Brigade Royal Field Artillery
 XVII Brigade, Royal Horse Artillery, formerly II Indian Brigade, Royal Horse Artillery

United States
 17th Aviation Brigade (United States)
 17th Fires Brigade (United States)

See also
 17th Division
 17th Regiment
 17 Squadron